Demi (born Charlotte Dumaresq Hunt; September 2, 1942) is a children’s book author and illustrator. During her career she has published over 300 titles.

Biography

Early life and education
Demi was born in Cambridge, Massachusetts. She is the great-grand daughter of the American painter William Morris Hunt, and the great-grand niece of architect Richard Morris Hunt. Demi earned her nickname as a young child when her father started calling her "demi" because she was half the size of her sister.

She studied art at Instituto Allende, Mexico, and with Sister Corita at the Immaculate Heart College in Los Angeles. She was a Fulbright scholar at the Maharaja Sayajirao University of Baroda, India where she received her Master's degree.

Career
Demi is known for her biographies for spiritual figures including Mahavira, Buddha, Krishna, Lao Tzu, Jesus, Mary (mother of Jesus), Muhammad, Rumi, Francis of Assisi, Gandhi, and the Dalai Lama.

Awards and honors
The Empty Pot was selected by former First Lady Barbara Bush in 1990 as one of the books to be read on the ABC Radio Network Program Mrs. Bush's Story Time. Based on a 2007 online poll, the National Education Association listed The Empty Pot as one of its "Teachers' Top 100 Books for Children." Gandhi was awarded the Oppenheim Toy Portfolio Platinum Award, while Muhammad was named a New York Times Best Illustrated Book.

Master of Zen: Extraordinary Teachings from Hui Neng’s Altar Sutra (World Wisdom, 2012), illustrated by Demi and translated and adapted by her husband Tze-si Huang, won a 2012 USA Best Book Award (Religion - Buddhism category).

One Grain Of Rice: A Mathematical Folktale was awarded Mathical Hall of Fame status.

A full list of over 20 awards and honors given to Demi’s books published by Wisdom Tales Press can be found on Demi’s author page at the publisher’s website.

In 1990, Demi and her husband Tze-si “Jesse” Huang represented the United States at the First Children’s International Book Conference in Beijing.

Select bibliography
 Marie Curie, Henry Holt and Co., 2018
 Florence Nightingale, Henry Holt and Co., 2014
 The Fantastic Adventures of Krishna, Wisdom Tales, 2013
 St. Francis of Assisi, Wisdom Tales, 2012
 Conference of the Birds (Illustrator, by Alexis York), Wisdom Tales, 2012
 Master of Zen: Extraordinary Teachings from Hui Neng’s Altar Sutra,(Illustrator, translated and adapted by Tze-si Huang), World Wisdom, 2012
 Tutankhamun, Marshall Cavendish, 2009
 Genghis Khan, Marshall Cavendish, 2009
 Rumi: Persian Poet, Whirling Dervish, Marshall Cavendish, 2009
 The Girl Who Drew a Phoenix, Margaret K. McElderry, 2008
 Marco Polo, Marshall Cavendish, 2008
 The Magic Pillow, Margaret K. McElderry, 2008
 The Boy Who Painted Dragons, Margaret K. McElderry, 2007
 The Legend of Lao Tzu and Tao Te Ching, Margaret K. McElderry, 2007
 Su Dongpo: Chinese Genius, Lee & Low, 2006
 Mary, Margaret K. McElderry, 2005
 Mother Theresa, Margaret K. McElderry, 2005
 Jesus, Margaret K. McElderry, 2005
 The Greatest Power, Margaret K. McElderry, 2004
 The Legend of St Nicholas, Margaret K. McElderry, 2003
 Muhammad, Margaret K. McElderry, 2003
 King Midas: The Golden Touch, Margaret K. McElderry, 2002
 Gandhi, Margaret K. McElderry, 2001
 The Dalai Lama: Foreword by his Holiness The Dalai Lama, Henry Holt and Company 1998
 One Grain of Rice: A Mathematical Folk Tale, Scholastic, 1997
 Buddha, Henry Holt and Company, 1996
 The Empty Pot, Henry Holt and Company, 1990
 Liang and the Magic Paintbrush, Henry Holt and Company, 1988
 The Hallowed Horse: A Folktale from India'', Dodd Mead, 1987

References

1942 births
Living people
American children's writers
American illustrators
Writers from Cambridge, Massachusetts
Artists from Massachusetts
Immaculate Heart College alumni
Instituto Allende alumni
Fulbright alumni